Dolichopteryx minuscula,  is a species of fish found in the Indo-West Pacific including Mauritius and Japan.

Size

References 

Opisthoproctidae
Fish of the Indian Ocean
Fish of the Pacific Ocean
Taxa named by Atsushi Fukui
Taxa named by Yasuyuki Kitagawa
Fish described in 2006